Claire Costa is a former Swiss slalom canoeist who competed from the late 1970s to the early 1980s.

She won a gold medal in the K-1 team event at the 1977 ICF Canoe Slalom World Championships in Spittal.

References
Overview of athlete's results at canoeslalom.net

Swiss female canoeists
Living people
Year of birth missing (living people)
Medalists at the ICF Canoe Slalom World Championships